Jack Dyer Crouch II (born July 1, 1958) is an American diplomat and national security adviser. Since 2014, he has been president and chief executive officer (CEO) of the United Service Organizations (USO).

Education
Crouch earned a Bachelor of Arts, Master of Arts, and PhD in international relations from the University of Southern California.

Career
Between 1984 and 1986, he worked in the Arms Control and Disarmament Agency for the Assistant Director for Strategic Programs and served as an advisor to the United States and Soviet Union Nuclear and Space Arms Talks.

Between 1986 and 1990, he was military legislative assistant to U.S. Senator from Wyoming Malcolm Wallop.

From 1990 to 1992, he served in the administration of U.S. President George H. W. Bush as the Principal Deputy Assistant Secretary of Defense for International Security Policy.

From 1993 to 2001, Crouch was Associate Professor of Defense and Strategic Studies at Southwest Missouri State University, located in Springfield, Missouri. He was a member of the board of editors of Comparative Strategy and a member of the board of advisors of the Center for Security Policy. While at Missouri, he also served as a reserve deputy sheriff in Christian County.

He was appointed Deputy National Security Advisor by U.S. President George W. Bush in March 2005, serving until May 2007. He previously served as the U.S. Ambassador to Romania (from 2004 to 2005) and as the Assistant Secretary of Defense for International Security Policy (from 2001 to 2003), among other positions in government under Republican administrations.

In 2014, Crouch was elected by the United Service Organizations Board of Governors to be the President and CEO of the USO. His term started on July 28, 2014.

See also

 List of people from Springfield, Missouri
 List of University of Southern California people

References

External links

White House biography

Place of birth missing (living people)
1958 births
21st-century American diplomats
Ambassadors of the United States to Romania
American deputy sheriffs
Arms control people
Employees of the United States Senate
George H. W. Bush administration personnel
George W. Bush administration personnel
Living people
Missouri State University faculty
People from Christian County, Missouri
United States Assistant Secretaries of Defense
USC School of International Relations alumni
American nonprofit chief executives
United States Deputy National Security Advisors